Ganga Talao (commonly known as Grand Bassin) is a crater lake situated in a secluded mountain area in the district of Savanne, deep in the heart of Mauritius. The first group of pilgrims who went to Ganga Talao were from the village of Triolet and it was led by Pandit Giri Gossayne from Terre Rouge in 1898.

It is considered the most sacred Hindu place in Mauritius.

The Shiv Mandir is located on the bank of the lake and is dedicated to Lord Shiva. There are temples dedicated to other Gods including Lord Hanuman, Goddess Ganga, and Lord Ganesh along the Grand Bassin.  During Shivaratri, around half a million Hindus in Mauritius go on a pilgrimage to the lake, many  walking bare feet from their homes carrying Kanvars.

Etymology
Ganga Talao literally means the 'Lake of Ganga'; an allusion to the Grand Bassin's symbolic connection with the Indian river Ganga (Ganges).

History 

In 1866, when Pandit Sanjibonlal came back to Mauritius after his first indentured contract was over, he came as a merchant via Reunion Island and brought with him the souvenir of Grand Bassin and cloth from India to be sold to the resident labourers. With the money gained, he bought the mansion of Mr Langlois at Triolet and materialised his dream of making Grand bassin a pilgrimage place. The Hindus believe firmly that they should, as often as possible, visit and take a bath in the Ganga to celebrate the main festival of Shiva. Panditji had already won esteem of the French as a landowner, so he easily got permission to go on his project.

During his stay as indentured labourer he had spotted the divine appeal of Grand Bassin. He converted the existing building into a temple and after some problems with the law he was allowed to proceed with the changes. Some artisans who were engaged in building Sockalingam Meenatchee Ammen Kovil in Port Louis helped in giving the temple the present shape. He went to India and brought back a huge Shivalingam, along with other deities, and had them consecrated in the sanctorum. The only temple in Mauritius where Bhairo Baba (a deity in the form of a dog) is consecrated inside a temple along with Shiva parivar. He was the first to start the pilgrimage towards Grand Bassin following the consecration in 1866. The consecration was a huge festival where he donated land, cart with oxen and huge amount of money to the officiating priests (Caturvedi) and others from Plaine des Papayes.

Others could not go save his servants because the labourers were not allowed to take leave for religious purposes.  Through word of mouth all labourers stated their wish to participate. He used his contacts and requested for permission. A first delegation headed by himself and some other rich retired labourers including Jhummun Gosagne Napal accompanied him in 1895, following the route he had already made in previous years when only his close friends have been there. The first halt was in Port Louis Madras road where he possessed a house. From there the next resting place was Vacoas at Padarath Ojha's place and then the procession with jhal and dholak and small kanvars moved to Grand Bassin. This was the nth time that Shivaratri was celebrated at Triolet under the priestship of Pandit Sanjibonlal.

In the meantime, other folk tales were added to that place and it got the name of Paritalao. It was believed that fairies used to come and dance during the night there. So, it is Sanajibonlall also popularly known as Mousse Langlois ke Baba who put dreams of Ganga in the subconscious mind of Jhummun Gossagne and helped to make the festival look as it is celebrated today. Later Prime Minister Ramgoolam brought Ganga water from Gomukh and mixed it with the already pure water of Grand Bassin and renamed it Ganga talao.

In 1897 Shri Jhummon Giri Gosagne Napal, a ‘pujari’ (priest) - of the Giri suborder of Dasnami Gosain (Goswami) Brahmins, a mainly Shaivite sect - of Triolet together with a 'pujari' priest from Goodlands Sri Mohanpersad saw in a dream the water of the lake of Grand Bassin springing from the ‘Jahnvi’, thus forming part of Ganga. The news of the dream spread rapidly and created quite a stir in the Hindu community. The following year, pilgrims trekked to Grand Bassin to collect its water to offer to Lord Shiva on the occasion of Maha Shivaratri. The lake was then known as the ‘Pari Talao’. In 1998 it was declared a "sacred lake". In 1972, some holy water from the Ganges River was mixed establishing a symbolic link with the sacred Indian River and the lake was renamed Ganga Talao.

Events 
During the Maha Shivaratri most of the devotees leave their homes and start a journey to Grand Bassin on foot. It has been a tradition that volunteer people offer foods and drinks to the pilgrims (the devotees).

Mangal Mahadev - Shiva Statue 

Mangal Mahadev is -tall statue of the Hindu god, Shiva, standing with his trident at the entrance of Ganga Talao. Inaugurated in 2007, it is the tallest statue in Mauritius and a faithful copy of the Shiva statue in Sursagar Lake in Vadodara, Gujarat in India.

Durga Mata Murti and Shiva Murti 

Durga Pooja and Navaratri are celebrated very grandly with many Hindu Mauritians assembling near the statue for the grand celebrations. 

Shiva Ratri is also celebrated very grandly and it is a national holiday. Very auspicious day to hindus at Mauritius.

Gallery

References

Lakes of Mauritius
Hindu pilgrimage sites in Mauritius
Indian diaspora in Mauritius
Sacred lakes